Walter McGowan, MBE (13 October 1942 – 15 February 2016), was a Scottish boxer born in Hamilton, South Lanarkshire. He was known for having been the world flyweight champion (Lineal champion. Recognized by European Boxing Union, British Boxing Board of Control and The Ring).

He was the son of Thomas McGowan, who had boxed under the name of "Joe Gans".

He was a skillful boxer, who showed brilliant footwork and knew how to use the ring. However, he suffered throughout his career with cuts, often having fights stopped despite being ahead on points. Without this failing, he would have had an even more successful career.

Amateur career
McGowan won the 1961 Amateur Boxing Association British flyweight title, when boxing out of the Royal Albert ABC.

He suffered only two defeats in 124 amateur bouts.

Professional career
He had his first professional fight in August 1961 when he fought George McDade at the Kelvin Hall, Glasgow, winning by a technical knockout in the third round.

He lost his third fight to Jackie Brown on points, but then continued to build up an impressive list of wins. In his tenth fight he fought Jackie Brown for the British and Commonwealth flyweight titles. The fight was in May 1963 at the Ice rink, Paisley, and McGowan won by a knockout in the twelfth round.

In September 1963, he defended his Commonwealth title against Kid Solomon from Jamaica. The fight was in Paisley, and McGowan won by a technical knockout in the ninth round.

In April 1964, he challenged for the European flyweight title, held by Italian, Salvatore Burruni. The fight was held in the Olympic Stadium, Rome, and McGowan suffered the second defeat of his career, losing on points over fifteen rounds.

In December 1965, he stepped up a weight and challenged for the European bantamweight title, held by Italian, Tommaso Galli. The fight was again in Rome and ended as a draw after fifteen rounds.

In June 1966, he again fought Salvatore Burruni, this time for the world flyweight championship (lineal, EBU and The Ring), which Burruni held. They met at the Empire Pool, Wembley, and McGowan won a fifteen-round points decision to gain that world title, despite sustaining a badly gashed eye in the seventh round. Cuts were to prove a major problem in his career.

In September 1966, he fought Alan Rudkin at the Empire Pool, for the British and Commonwealth bantamweight titles that he held. McGowan scored another fifteen-round points win, despite suffering a cut eye in the tenth round.

In December 1966, he defended his world title against Chartchai Chionoi in Bangkok, Thailand. The Thai fighter won and took the title when McGowan suffered a badly cut nose in the ninth round, and the referee was forced to stop the fight.

The two boxers had a re-match at the Empire Pool in September 1967, but again the Thai boxer won and kept his title, when cuts to both McGowan's eyes and his forehead caused the referee to stop the fight in the seventh.

In McGowan's next fight, in May 1968, he lost his British and Commonwealth bantamweight titles to Alan Rudkin. The fight was at Belle Vue, Manchester and Rukin won by a fifteen-round points decision.

McGowan fought six more fights, all against foreign boxers, winning them all, before retiring. His last fight was in November 1969 against Domenico Antonio Chiloiro.

Retirement
He became the first Scottish world-boxing champion to be so honoured when he was appointed Member of the Order of the British Empire (MBE) in the 1967 Queen's Birthday Honours List.

He was inducted into the Scottish Sports Hall of Fame in 2002, alongside the likes of Scottish boxing great Ken Buchanan.

Later life and death
McGowan died at Monklands Hospital at Airdrie, North Lanarkshire on 15 February 2016. He had been in poor health in his later years and was living in a nursing home in Bellshill, North Lanarkshire.

Professional boxing record

See also
 List of flyweight boxing champions
 List of The Ring world champions
 List of British bantamweight boxing champions
 List of British flyweight boxing champions

References

External links
 Scottish Sports Hall of Fame (accessed 3–06–07)
 Walter McGowan wins flyweight world title 1966, BBC (accessed 3–06–07)
 Maurice Golesworthy, Encyclopaedia of Boxing (Eighth Edition) (1988), Robert Hale Limited, 
 
 Walter McGowan – CBZ Profile
 Walter Roderick McKay McGowan at North Lanarkshire Sporting Hall Of Fame

|-

|-

|-

1942 births
2016 deaths
Scottish male boxers
Flyweight boxers
World boxing champions
World flyweight boxing champions
The Ring (magazine) champions
Members of the Order of the British Empire
Sportspeople from Hamilton, South Lanarkshire